Igor Muller (also spelled Müller or Mueller, born 1 November 1967) is a Luxembourgian judoka. He competed at the 1992 Summer Olympics and the 1996 Summer Olympics.

Achievements

References

External links
 
 

1967 births
Living people
Luxembourgian male judoka
Olympic judoka of Luxembourg
Judoka at the 1992 Summer Olympics
Judoka at the 1996 Summer Olympics